The 2013 Canadian Olympic Curling Trials (branded as the 2013 Tim Hortons Roar of the Rings for sponsorship reasons) were held from December 1 to 8 at the MTS Centre in Winnipeg, Manitoba. The winners of the men's and women's events were chosen to represent Canada at the 2014 Winter Olympics.

Qualification process
The qualification process for the 2013 Olympic trials differed slightly from the process used at the 2009 Trials. For both the men's and women's events, a pool of 18 teams were designated as eligible to represent Canada at the 2014 Winter Olympics, based on rankings from the Canadian Team Ranking System (CTRS). From the pool of 18, six teams were selected to qualify directly to the Trials. The 12 remaining teams competed in a pre-trial tournament from November 5–10 in Kitchener, where the top two teams in each division qualified to the eight-team draw for the Trials proper.

Men

Women

Men

Teams
The teams are listed as follows:

Round-robin standings
Final round-robin standings

Round-robin results
All draw times are listed in Central Standard Time (UTC−6).

Draw 2
Sunday, December 1, 6:30 pm

Draw 4
Monday, December 2, 1:30 pm

Draw 6
Tuesday, December 3, 8:30 am

Draw 8
Tuesday, December 3, 6:30 pm

Draw 10
Wednesday, December 4, 1:30 pm

Draw 13
Thursday, December 5, 6:30 pm

Draw 14
Friday, December 6, 8:30 am

Playoffs

Semifinal
Saturday, December 7, 1:30 pm

Final
Sunday, December 8, 2:00 pm

Women

Teams
The teams are listed as follows:

Round-robin standings
Final round robin Standings

Note: At the conclusion of the round robin, Carey, Homan, and Middaugh were all tied at second place. The tie between the three teams was broken by the draw shot challenge. Homan had the best result in the challenge, and was thus awarded the second seed and a spot in the semifinal, while Carey and Middaugh will play a tiebreaker to determine the third seed.

Round-robin results
All draw times are listed in Central Standard Time (UTC−6).

Draw 1
Sunday, December 1, 1:00 pm

Draw 3
Monday, December 2, 8:30 am

Draw 5
Monday, December 2, 6:30 pm

Draw 7
Tuesday, December 3, 1:30 pm

Draw 9
Wednesday, December 4, 8:30 am

Draw 11
Wednesday, December 4, 6:30 pm

Draw 12
Thursday, December 5, 1:30 pm

Tiebreaker
Friday, December 6, 1:30 pm

Playoffs

Semifinal
Friday, December 6, 6:30 pm

Final
Saturday, December 7, 6:30 pm

Statistics
Round robin only

Women

Top 5 player percentages

Team percentages

Perfect games

Men

Top 5 player percentages

Team percentages

Perfect games

References

External links

Olympic
Canadian Olympic Curling Trials
2013 in Manitoba
Curling competitions in Winnipeg
Trials
Canadian Olympic Curling Trials 
Olympic Curling Trials